"The Monkey's Paw" is a short story by W. W. Jacobs.

The Monkey's Paw may also refer to:

Films

 The Monkey's Paw (1923 film), a British silent film
 The Monkey's Paw (1933 film), a 1933 United States horror film; considered lost
 The Monkey's Paw (1948 film), a 1948 British horror film
 The Monkey's Paw (2013 film), a 2013 horror film

Other
 The Monkey's Paw (bookstore), a Toronto bookstore
 "The Monkey's Paw" (The Simpsons), a 1991 episode
 "Monkey's Paw", a song by Smalltown Poets from the 1997 eponymous album
 Monkey's Paw, cheating device used on older computerized slot machines
 Marcgravia umbellata, species of flowering vine referred to as "monkey paws"

See also
 Monkey Fist (disambiguation)
 MonkeyPaw Games, an American video game publisher
 Monkeypaw Productions
 Monkey's paw knot or monkey's fist